Jonassen is a surname. Notable people with the surname include:

Emil Jonassen (born 1993), Norwegian football player
Fartein Døvle Jonassen (born 1971), Norwegian novelist and translator
Hagbard Jonassen (1903–1977), Danish botanist, quaternary geologist, war resister and nuclear disarmament proponent
Kenneth Jonassen (born 1974), male badminton player from Denmark
Vitus Jonassen Bering or Vitus Bering (1681–1741), Danish-born navigator in the service of the Russian Navy

See also
Jonassen Island, one of several Antarctic islands around the peninsula known as Graham Land
Jonassen Rocks, small group of rocks lying off the south coast of South Georgia
Joensen
Johannessen
Johnsen
Jonasson
Jonsson

nl:Jonassen